John Raphael Rodrigues Brandon (5 April 1817 in London – 8 October 1877 at his chambers at 17 Clement's Inn, Strand, London) was a British architect and architectural writer.

Life

Training 
He was the second child of the six children of Joshua de Isaac Moses Rodrigues Brandon and his wife, Sarah.  He learned architecture under J. Dédeau in Alençon, France and then under Joseph T. Parkinson (to whom he was apprenticed in 1836).

Publications
Both he and his brother Joshua Arthur Rodrigues Brandon were keen adherents of the Neo Gothic style and, as well as going into private practice together between 1841 and 1847 at Beaufort Buildings, Strand, they jointly produced a series of three works on Early English ecclesiastical architecture that became and remained architectural pattern books for the whole 19th century – 
Analysis of Gothic Architecture (1847) – more than 700 examples of windows, doors, windows, and other architectural details, with measurements observed at first hand, collected from parish churches
Parish Churches (1848) – 63 churches from across England, each with perspective views, a short description in text and a plan (to the same scale for all the churches)
Open Timber Roofs of the Middle Ages (1849) – perspective, geometric and detail drawings of 35 timber roofs from parish churches in 11 different English counties, showing their form and principle of each example, with an introduction on the topic in general.  The Builder commented that the work:
serves the one useful and necessary purpose of showing practically and constructively what the builders of the middle ages really did with the materials they had at hand, and how all those materials, whatever they were, were made to harmonise.

Buildings
In the 1840s John and Joshua designed several stations and engine-houses in the style of medieval manor houses on the London and Croydon Railway, disguising chimneys as early Gothic church bell-towers.  Joshua's own exhibited designs at the Royal Academy between 1838 and 1874 included a design for Colchester town hall (1843, in his and Blore's name – built in 1845) and in 1853, together with Robert Ritchie, a design for the interior of the Church of Christ the King, Bloomsbury of the Catholic Apostolic Church. The Royal Kent Dispensary building (later part of Miller General Hospital) in Greenwich High Road is also attributed to Brandon & Ritchie. John was architect of the restoration of St Martin's Church, Leicester (now Leicester Cathdedral.) This included the building of the tower and spire. The tower was completed in 1862 and the spire in 1867. The work on this was in the correct Early English style,although his work elsewhere in the church was in the perpendicular style. The tower and spire are, according to Pevsner, "intentionally impressive" and loosely based on Ketton Church in Rutland.

Among the many churches Joshua built independently were the small church of St Peter's in Great Windmill Street, London (1848) and Holy Trinity Church, Knightsbridge (1861), both of which have since been demolished.  He also built, altered, and restored many other churches.  However, even Brandon's becoming a fellow of the Institute of British Architects in 1860 failed to bring him the same success as an active architect as he had had as an author and this, the early death of his brother Joshua, and the death of his wife and child, all drove him to suicide by shooting himself in the head.

Thomas Hardy, who worked briefly for Brandon, based his description of Henry Knight's chambers in his novel A Pair of Blue Eyes on his office at Clement's Inn. Brandon also employed James Rawson Carroll, architect of the Royal Victoria Eye and Ear Hospital, Dublin, Ireland.

References

External links 
 , from Internet Archive
 , from Internet Archive

Sources 
 
 Dictionary of National Biography
A. Felstead, J. Franklin, and L. Pinfield, eds., Directory of British architects, 1834–1900 (1993); 2nd edn, ed. A.Brodie and others, 2 vols.(2001)
L. D. Barnett and others, eds., Bevis Marks records: being contributions to the history of the Spanish and Portuguese Congregation in London, 5 vols. (1940–93)
The Builder, 35 (1877), 1041, 1051–2
The Builder, 5 (1847), 603
E. Jamilly, ‘Anglo-Jewish architects, and architecture in the 18th and 19th centuries’, Transactions of the Jewish Historical Society of England, 18 (1953–55), 127–41, esp. 135–6
 Algernon Graves, The Royal Academy of Arts: a complete dictionary of contributors and their work from its foundation in 1769 to 1904, 8 vols.(1905–06), (1970), (1972)
G. Stamp and C. Amery, Victorian buildings of London, 1837–1887: an illustrated guide (1980), 40–41 ·
The architect's, engineer's, and building-trades' directory (1868)
Catalogue of the drawings collection of the Royal Institute of British Architects, Royal Institute of British Architects, 20 vols. (1969–89)
C. Barry, Sessional Papers of the Royal Institute of British Architects (1877–78), 10

1817 births
1877 deaths
19th-century English architects
Architects from London
English expatriates in France
English people of Portuguese-Jewish descent
Suicides by firearm in England